Torrance Moran Norris (born June 16, 1978) is a former American football fullback. He was drafted by the New Orleans Saints in the fourth round of the 2001 NFL Draft. He played college football at Kansas.

Norris has also played for the Houston Texans, Detroit Lions and San Francisco 49ers.

Early years
Moran graduated from Madison High School in Houston, Texas in 1996.

College career
Norris went on to play for the University of Kansas.

Professional career

New Orleans Saints
He was drafted by the New Orleans Saints in the fourth round (115th overall) in the 2001 NFL Draft. Norris played his entire season with the Saints before being waived on September 17, 2002.

Houston Texans
A day after being waived by the Saints, Norris was claimed off waived by the Houston Texans on September 18, 2002. He was a member of the Texans through the 2005 season. In 2005, Norris played in all 16 games with five starts and had one reception for four yards and 12 special teams tackles.

First stint with 49ers
Norris was signed as a free agent by the 49ers in 2006. That season, he helped 49ers running back Frank Gore rush for 1,695 yards and earn a Pro Bowl selection. Norris caught two passes for touchdowns that season; one of those coming in the season finale against the Denver Broncos, helping to knock them out of the playoffs.

Norris was released by the 49ers during final cuts on August 30, 2008.

Detroit Lions
Norris was signed by the Detroit Lions on 9 October 2008 after running back Marcus Thomas was waived. Norris was released before the team's next game on 12 October 2008 when quarterback Drew Henson was promoted to the active roster. Norris was once again signed by the Lions on 13 October 2008 after safety Gerald Alexander was put on the injured reserve list.

Second stint with 49ers
An unrestricted free agent in the 2009 offseason, Norris was re-signed by the San Francisco 49ers on February 27, 2009. The three-year, $5 million contract included a $1.5-million signing bonus.

Second stint with Texans
Norris had a brief stint with the Texans during the 2012 preseason. He was signed on June 14, 2012 and was released on August 31.

Moran Norris Foundation
The Moran Norris Foundation was started in 2005. Moran and his wife Tamara, both Houston natives created the foundation to help at-risk students achieve their goals.

References

1978 births
Living people
American football fullbacks
Detroit Lions players
Houston Texans players
Kansas Jayhawks football players
New Orleans Saints players
Players of American football from Houston
San Francisco 49ers players